The 1896 Ohio Green and White football team was an American football team that represented Ohio University as an independent during the 1896 college football season. In its third season of intercollegiate football, Ohio compiled a 4–2–1 record and was outscored by a total of 100 to 70. Frank Rembsburg was the team's head coach; it was Rembsurg's first and only season in the position.

Schedule

References

Ohio
Ohio Bobcats football seasons
Ohio Green and White football